Hajnalka Sipos is a Hungarian football goalkeeper currently playing for ŽNK Osijek in the Croatian 1st Division. She has played the Champions League with MTK Hungária FC and Osijek.

She has been a member of the Hungarian national team.

References

1972 births
Living people
Hungarian women's footballers
Women's association football goalkeepers
Renova players
László Kórház SC players
MTK Hungária FC (women) players
ŽNK Osijek players
Croatian Women's First Football League players
Hungary women's international footballers
Expatriate footballers in Croatia
Expatriate women's footballers in Slovakia